Coleophora safadella is a moth of the family Coleophoridae. It is found in the United Arab Emirates.

References

safadella
Moths described in 2008
Endemic fauna of the United Arab Emirates
Moths of Asia